Benton may refer to:

Places

Canada
Benton, a local service district south of Woodstock, New Brunswick
Benton, Newfoundland and Labrador

United Kingdom
Benton, Devon, near Bratton Fleming
Benton, Tyne and Wear

United States
Benton, Alabama
Benton, Arkansas
Benton, California
Benton, Illinois
Benton, Indiana
Benton, Iowa
Benton, Kansas
Benton, Kentucky
Benton, Louisiana
Benton, Maine
Benton, Michigan
Benton, Missouri
Benton, New Hampshire
Benton, New York
Benton, Ohio
Benton, Pennsylvania (disambiguation)
Benton, Tennessee
Benton, Wisconsin
Benton (town), Wisconsin
Benton (Middleburg, Virginia), a historic house
Benton Charter Township, Michigan
Benton Crossing, California
Benton Harbor, Michigan
Benton Hot Springs, California (ghost town)
Benton Ridge, Ohio
Fort Benton, Montana
Lake Benton, Minnesota
Utu Utu Gwaitu Paiute Tribe of the Benton Paiute Reservation, California

People
Benton (surname)

Other
 The Benton meteorite of 1949, which fell in New Brunswick, Canada (see Meteorite falls)
Benton fireworks disaster, a 1983 industrial disaster near Benton, Tennessee
Benton Museum of Art ("the Benton") at Pomona College in Claremont, California

See also
 Ben (disambiguation)
 Benton City (disambiguation)
 Benton County (disambiguation), any of several in the United States
 Benton Station (disambiguation)
 Benton Township (disambiguation), any of several in the United States
 Bentonville (disambiguation)
 Bentown, Illinois
 Benville (disambiguation)
 Fort Benton (disambiguation)
 William Benton Museum of Art, in Storrs, Connecticut